This is a list of Commonwealth of Nations countries by gross domestic product (GDP) at purchasing power parity (PPP). Gross domestic product is the value of all final goods and services produced within a nation in a given year. The GDP dollar estimates presented here are calculated at market or government official exchange rates. Values are given in millions of international dollars. Dependent territories are shown in italics and are not ranked, and their flags are shown alongside the country of which they are a territory.

The table below shows the latest PPP and PPP per capita data for Commonwealth countries and territories of the member countries. Most figures (including for the world) are 2019 estimates from the International Monetary Fund. Other figures are estimates from The World Factbook of the Central Intelligence Agency (for GDP and GDP per capita), and are noted beside the figures along with the year of estimate. 

Click on one of the small triangles in the headings to re-order the list according to that category.

Note: The figures for the dependent territories are slightly outdated (e.g. the GDP per capita figure for the Cayman Islands is from 2004), therefore they may not be easily compared with more recent figures for sovereign states.

Notes

References

See also 
 List of countries by leading trade partners
 List of national and international statistical services

GDP
UK, Commonwealth of Nations
GDP